Robert Henry Fernando Rippon (c. 1836 – 16 January 1917) was an English zoologist, entomologist and illustrator. He was a musician for a while but took a keen amateur interest in entomology and published a major multivolume work on the birdwing butterflies, the Icones Ornithopterum (1898-1906).

Born in Bocking, Essex very little of his early life is documented. His interested included poetry and music, with several piano compositions to his credit. Around 1876 he moved to London and took to illustration for a living. He produced several plates for Frederick DuCane Godman and Osbert Salvin's Biologia Centrali-Americana. He was a close friend of John Obadiah Westwood, to whom he dedicated the first volume of his magnum opus on the birdwing butterflies. This illustrated monograph Icones Ornithopterorum (1898 to 1906) covered the birdwing butterflies. It was initially planned for 20 parts but later made up of 25 parts which were to be bound into two volumes. The second volume was dedicated to Lord Walter Rothschild. This work included 111 plates, all of which were illustrated and hand coloured by himself. He was also a friend of the entomologist George Robert Crotch. 

He had a daughter named Faithful and a son, Edrick Victor Rippon, who took an interest in molluscs and insects, living later in Toronto. Rippon is noted as a religious person and a teetotaler. He objected to corporal and capital punishment. Towards the end of his life he lived at Upper Norwood and wished that his collection could be acquired in full rather than get broken up. After his death, his private collection was offered for 1000 pounds by his wife to the British Museum. It was thought to be overpriced and Miss E M Bowdler Sharpe, daughter of Richard Bowdler Sharpe, was assigned to evaluate the value of the collections. She evaluated it at about 500 - 600, noting that the specimens were good, well labelled and worthy of acquisition. William Evans Hoyle of wrote to Lord Rhondda suggesting that the value of the collection was worth more than the 1000 sought by Mrs Rippon. The collection also included bird skins whose fate is unknown but the collection of insects was bought by Lord Rhondda and donated to the National Museum of Wales; it included more than 105,000 specimens.

References

External links

 Icones Ornitopterorum. Volume 1 Volume 2

1836 births
1917 deaths
English zoologists
English illustrators
English lepidopterists
People associated with Amgueddfa Cymru – Museum Wales